J'arrive is Jacques Brel's eleventh studio album. Originally released in 1968 by Barclay (80373), the album was reissued on 23 September 2003 as part of the 16-CD box set Boîte à Bonbons by Barclay (980 816-3).

Track listing 

 Tracks 1–9 constituted the original 1968 album.
 Tracks 10–11 were added to the album when it was reissued as part of the 16-CD box set Boîte à Bonbons.

Personnel 

 Jacques Brel – composer, vocals
 François Rauber – orchestra conductor, musical director
 Marcel Azzola - accordion on "Vesoul" and "L'éclusier"
 Janine De Waleyne - backing vocals on "Je suis un soir d'été" (uncredited)
 Gerhardt Lehner – recording engineer & audio mixing (uncredited)
 Jean-Marie Guérin – mastering
 Jean-Pierre Leloir – photography

References 

Jacques Brel albums
1968 albums
French-language albums
Barclay (record label) albums
Universal Records albums
Albums conducted by François Rauber